Sivan Design Group, also known as C1 Design Group, is an Iranian car design firm and full-service product development company in Tehran, Iran.
Founded in 2006 by Alireza Mohammadzadeh & Mohammad Hossein Amini Yekta.
SIVAN Group has grown from a two-person design and engineering company to a full-service product development firm, able to meet the demands of any project. Sivan group have diverse and specialized backgrounds in design, engineering, modeling, rapid prototyping, fabrication and manufacturing.

Group Companies
 Sivan design co.
 Vira design co.
 Pishro fan Ajand co.

Work

Production & prototype models
Sivan Design Group has been credited for the design of a wide variety of concept as well as production cars since the firm's founding in 2006 such as:

Notable car designs
Samand Facelift
Samand Ambulance
Saipa Diesel New Budsun NB8
Mercedes-Benz O309 facelift (O511)
Iran Khodro Diesel Bus O457 facelift (FLO 457)

Cooperation with universities
Sharif University of Technology in designing Electric car in electric car competition 2008
University of Tehranin designing Electric car in electric car competition 2010

Design Contest & Automotive design exhibition
Sivan design group has been held design contest in automotive filed every 2 Year. First contest held from 24 April to 24 September 2009 and the first collective concept car design exhibition titled "From Dream to Reality" took place from 18 to 23 April 2009 at the Kamal Aldin Behzad Gallery in Teheran, Iran.

Gallery

References

External links 

 

Vehicle design
Car manufacturers of Iran
Companies based in Tehran
Companies established in 2006